The California Demonstration State Forests are operated by the California Department of Forestry and Fire Protection.

See also 
 California Department of Forestry and Fire Protection
 List of U.S. National Forests

References 

 , California Department of Forestry and Fire Protection
Area of State Forests as of 1996, CDF/Resource Management Program, 1996.

External links 
Fire.ca.gov: official California State Forests website
Fire.ca.gov: California Department of Forestry and Fire Protection (CDF) website

List
California state forests, List
California
State forests
State forests